Kosewo may refer to the following places:
Kosewo, Gmina Nasielsk in Masovian Voivodeship (east-central Poland)
Kosewo, Gmina Pomiechówek in Masovian Voivodeship (east-central Poland)
Kosewo, Ostrów Mazowiecka County in Masovian Voivodeship (east-central Poland)
Kosewo, Żuromin County in Masovian Voivodeship (east-central Poland)
Kosewo, Greater Poland Voivodeship (west-central Poland)
Kosewo, Warmian-Masurian Voivodeship (north Poland)